Sawano (written: 澤野) is a Japanese surname. Notable people with the surname include:

, Japanese pole vaulter
, Japanese composer and musician
Mizue Sawano (born 1941), Japanese painter

Japanese-language surnames